Kanopolis Drive-in Theatre, opened in 1952, is a single-screen Drive-in theater located on the northwest side of Kanopolis, Kansas. The theater, which has a 60x30 feet screen and a capacity of 165 cars, ran in continuous operation until 2006. The theatre re-opened as the Kanopolis Drive-In in May 2011.

History
Kanopolis Drive-in was opened by U.S. veteran Tony Blazina in 1952. Prior to its opening, Blazina had a mobile movie business, in which he and his wife, Olga, were hired by merchants in surrounding small towns to show movies for customers. From this experience, Tony designed a drive-in theater initially with a smaller screen. The current 60x30 feet screen was installed after the original was damaged in a wind storm. Following Tony's death in 1994, the family business was managed by Olga, and daughters, Liz Ray and Irene Pacey.

The theater operated continuously until Olga's death in 2009, followed by Ray  two months later. Pacey considered reopening after five years, but decided to sell the theater to Ellsworth County residents Josh and Amanda Webb. The Webb family invested in maintenance and modernization of the theater, including the installation of a new roof on the projector house, new FM audio transmitters for movie sound, and repainting of the movie screen. The theater was reopened in May 2011, and converted to a digital projection system in 2013.

References

Drive-in theaters in the United States
Tourist attractions in Ellsworth County, Kansas
1952 establishments in Kansas
Theatres completed in 1952